Corynanthe johimbe, synonym Pausinystalia johimbe, common name yohimbe, is a plant species in the family Rubiaceae native to western and central Africa (Nigeria, Cabinda, Cameroon, Congo-Brazzaville, Gabon, Equatorial Guinea). Extracts from yohimbe have been used in traditional medicine in West Africa as an aphrodisiac, called in some languages burantashi, and have been marketed in developed countries as dietary supplements.

Synonyms

Botanical
According to Royal Botanical Gardens Kew, Plants of the World Online, the accepted name is Corynanthe johimbe K.Schum (first published in Notizbl. Bot. Gart. Berlin-Dahlem 3: 94, 1901) and it has the following recognised synonyms:

Homotypic:

Pausinystalia johimbe (K.Schum.) Pierre in Actes Soc. Linn. Bordeaux 61: 130 (1906)
Pseudocinchona johimbe (K.Schum.) A.Chev. in : 266 (1926)

Heterotypic:

Pausinystalia trillesii Beille in Actes Soc. Linn. Bordeaux 61: 130 (1906)
Pausinystalia zenkeri W.Brandt in Arch. Pharm. (Berlin) 260: 67 (1922).

Scientific (general)
In scientific papers generally (i.e. not just in specialist botanical literature) the usage Pausinystalia johimbe is the most frequent, followed by Pausinystalia yohimbe.

Description 
Yohimbe is one of a number of Corynanthe evergreen species growing in West and Central Africa in lowland forests. The tree grows about 30m tall, with a straight bole that is rarely larger than 50–60 cm in diameter. The bark is grey to reddish-brown, with longitudinal fissures, easy to peel and bitter-tasting. The inner bark is pinkish and fibrous.  The sapwood is yellowish and the heartwood is ochre-yellow; the wood is fine-grained and relatively dense and moderately hard. The leaves grow in groups of three, with short (about 2 cm) petioles. The blades are oval-shaped, 11–47 cm long and 5–17 cm wide.

Conservation
The demand for yohimbe bark has led to over-exploitation, with the possibility of long-term threat to sustainability of the species. Cameroon is the biggest exporter. Over-exploitation has led to concerns that C. johimbe is becoming an endangered species.

Uses 

The wood and bark are used for firewood and construction. Bark  the most commercially important product  is used in extractions to make tinctures for traditional medicine and dietary supplements.

The main phytochemical in the extract is the indoloquinolizidine alkaloid yohimbine. It also contains other alkaloids, such as corynanthine and raubasine, with undefined properties, adding further to concerns about its safety.

Human use and adverse effects
Extracts from yohimbe bark are used in West African traditional medicine in the belief that it is a herbal tonic and aphrodisiac. Yohimbe bark and extract are used in manufactured dietary supplements, but there is no scientific evidence they have any effect, and yohimbine levels may vary substantially among supplement products.

Although proposed as a potential treatment for erectile dysfunction in humans, there are concerns about its safety or effectiveness. Side effects of using yohimbe, particularly in high doses, may include hypertension, increased heart rate, headache, nausea, tremors, and insomnia. Yohimbe bark extract has been declared as insufficiently characterized and possibly unsafe to consume by the European Union and US National Institutes of Health.  Yohimbine specifically has so been declared by the European Union, but not by the US National Institutes of Health.

See also 
 Coffea
 Mitragyna speciosa
 List of herbs with known adverse effects
 Yohimbine

References 

Naucleeae
Flora of Nigeria
Flora of West-Central Tropical Africa
Plants described in 1901
Medicinal plants of Africa